Perry Brooks (December 4, 1954 – March 1, 2010) was an American football defensive tackle in the National Football League (NFL) for the Washington Redskins.  He played college football at Southern University and was drafted in the seventh round of the 1976 NFL Draft by the New England Patriots. He is the father of linebacker Ahmad Brooks.

After his career ended, Brooks served as a salesman at Cowles Nissan in Woodbridge, Virginia.

References

1954 births
2010 deaths
American football defensive linemen
People from Bogalusa, Louisiana
Players of American football from Louisiana 
Southern Jaguars football players
Washington Redskins players